The following is a list of justices of the Delaware Supreme Court. From 1772 to 1950, Delaware did not have appointed Supreme Court justices. Instead, appeals from intermediate appellate determinations were taken to "The High Court of Errors and Appeals" – a panel made up of the state Chancellor, and all judges of the "Supreme Court" and of the Courts of Common Pleas who had not previously been involved with the case; under that system, the sole "Supreme Court" justice was the chief justice of Delaware.

In 1950, Delaware created a new state Supreme Court, with three judges appointed by the governor.

Pre-1950 judicial officers

Post-1950 judicial officers

Chief justices of the High Court of Errors and Appeals

Colonial chief justices of the Supreme Court of the Lower Counties

Chief justices of the state of Delaware

References

History of the Delaware Supreme Court
Henry R. Horsey and William Duffy, The Supreme Court of Delaware After 1951: The Separate Supreme Court
Delaware Chief Justices – Leaders of the Judicial Branch
Delaware State Courts – Judges who have served on the Superior Court bench

 
Delaware
Justices